John William Ferdon (December 13, 1826 – August 5, 1884) was a U.S. Representative from New York.

Early life
Ferdon was born in Piermont, New York on December 13, 1826. He was the son of William Ferdon (1787–1872) and Elizabeth (née Perry) Ferdon (1792–1869).

Ferdon graduated from Rutgers College in 1847. Then he studied law, was admitted to the bar, and practiced.

Career
He was a Know Nothing member of the New York State Assembly (Rockland Co.) in 1855; and of the New York State Senate (7th D.) in 1856 and 1857.

He was delegate to the 1864 (where Abraham Lincoln was renominated for President) and 1876 Republican National Conventions (where Rutherford B. Hayes was nominated for President).

Ferdon was elected as a Republican to the 46th United States Congress, holding office from March 4, 1879, to March 3, 1881.

Personal life
Ferndon was married to Harriet Strong (1825–1893), a daughter of prominent mathematician and professor Theodore Strong.  His wife was the aunt of New Jersey State Senator Theodore Strong. Together, they were the parents of five children, three daughters and two sons:
 Lucy Dix Ferdon (1851–1896), who married Hoffman Rogers (1846–1912), a descendant of William Bayard Jr., in 1872.
 James Perry Ferdon (1856–1937).
 Elizabeth Perry Ferdon (1857–1896), who married George Matthew Gillies (1859–1918).
 Mary Van Dyke Ferdon (1860–1924), who married William Herbert Shaw (1857–1915).
 Theodore William Dwight Ferdon (1869–1904).

Ferdon died of kidney disease after an illness of six weeks on August 5, 1884 in Monmouth Beach, New Jersey.  He was buried at a private cemetery on the Ferdon estate in Piermont, New York.  His home at Piermont, known as Ferdon Hall was listed on the National Register of Historic Places in 2011.

References

External links
 

1826 births
1884 deaths
Republican Party members of the New York State Assembly
Republican Party New York (state) state senators
Rutgers University alumni
New York (state) Know Nothings
People from Piermont, New York
Republican Party members of the United States House of Representatives from New York (state)
19th-century American politicians